How the West Was Won is a live triple album by the English rock group Led Zeppelin, released by Atlantic Records on compact disc on 27 May 2003, DVD-Audio on 7 October 2003 and Blu-Ray Audio in 2018. The recordings are taken from two 1972 performances in California during their tour of North America: L.A. Forum (25 June 1972) and Long Beach Arena (27 June 1972).

Background 
Guitarist Jimmy Page considers Led Zeppelin at this point to have been at their artistic peak, as is mentioned in the album's liner notes and in an interview he gave to The Times newspaper in 2010.

For many years, recordings of these two shows circulated only in the form of bootlegs, such as Burn Like a Candle. Though soundboard recordings of Led Zeppelin concerts were circulated among fans after being stolen from Page's personal archive in the mid-1980s, no such versions of the 1972 Long Beach or LA Forum shows were taken, meaning How the West Was Won was the first chance fans had of hearing the soundboard versions of these concerts.  The songs from the two shows underwent extensive editing and audio engineering by Page at Island Studios in London before being released on the album.

"It wasn't in our thoughts to try and outdo The Song Remains the Same…" remarked engineer Kevin Shirley. "The reason those performances still stand up now is because Jimmy really was a genius. He could create tempests, summon storms. He really was the master of light and shade. And the musicians around him allowed him to flesh out that vision. Especially John Bonham, without whom Jimmy and Zeppelin would never have been able to do what he did."

The album was remastered and reissued on 23 March 2018 in many formats, including 3CD, 4LP, Blu-Ray Audio and a Super Deluxe Edition box set.

Reception

The album debuted on the Billboard 200 chart for the week ending 14 June 2003 at number 1, with sales of 154,000 copies. It remained on the chart for 16 weeks. It was certified gold and platinum by the RIAA on 30 June 2003. How the West Was Won received an overall score of 97 by review site Metacritic.

Track listing

Notes:
The DVD-Audio version of the album has tracks 1–11 on disc one with tracks 12–18 on disc two. It features the whole album in 24bit/48 kHz for both 5.1 and Stereo.
The Blu-Ray Audio version of the albums has all tracks on one disc. It features the whole album in 24-bit/96kHz DTS-Master Audio 5.1, as well as two stereo tracks (PCM and DTS-MA)
The 4 LP version of the album has tracks 1–4 on Side A, tracks 5, 12 & 13 on Side B, track 6 & 7 on Side C, track 8–10 on Side D, tracks 11, 14 & 15 on Sides E, F & G respectively, and tracks 16–18 on Side H
The medley omitting "Hello Mary Lou" has a runtime of 20:59 in the 2018 reissue

Personnel
Led Zeppelin
Robert Plant – vocals, harmonica
Jimmy Page – guitars, mandolin
John Paul Jones – bass guitar, double bass, bass pedals, keyboards, mandolin, backing vocals
John Bonham – drums, percussion, backing vocals, co-lead vocals on "Bron-Yr-Aur Stomp"

Additional personnel
Jim Cummins – photography
James Fortune – photography
Drew Griffiths – sound assistant
Ross Halfin – package creative consultant
Eddie Kramer – engineering
Phil Lemon – design, artwork
Jeffrey Mayer – photography
Michael Putland – photography
Kevin Shirley – engineering, mixing
John Davis – mastering (2018 reissue)

Charts

Weekly charts

Year-end charts

Certifications

Release history

References

External links
How the West Was Won from Led Zeppelin's official site
The Garden Tapes – analysis of live tracks edits for the album

2003 live albums
Albums produced by Jimmy Page
Atlantic Records live albums
Led Zeppelin live albums
Live folk rock albums